Mnemonic is an alternative rock band, formed as Mnemonic Groove in "Singapore" in 1997 and now based in London, England.

The band formed as a result of impromptu jam sessions and quickly released their debut album on the Angel J. Records label, entitled Non-Verbal Signs of Listening on 23 May 1997, and garnered international attention with the release of their cover of the U2 song, "The Ground Beneath Her Feet" in January 2000.

1996–1997: Mnemonic Groove

"Mnemonic Groove" was officially formed in Singapore after a series of jam sessions at "Boon Studios" in January 1997. Richard Das, Jonathan Skipp and Kiron Chahel had already performed in public at ad hoc concerts in Singapore during 1996 as an unnamed trio prior to collaborating with Aaron Jude Sequerah in January 1997.

The band name originated from picking words from a dictionary.

Their debut album, "Non-Verbal Signs of Listening" was released on 23 May 1997 culminating in a promotional live performance and album signings at "Boat Quay" in Singapore.

After releasing their debut album and undertaking a series of promotional interviews for magazines and radio shows, the band separated in August 1997 and went on hiatus due to global commitments.

Members then commenced writing music from Australia, the US and the United Kingdom and building up their online presence which they felt was the way forward for online music and video distribution.

1998–2000: International Exposure

The band changed their name to "Mnemonic" early 1998.

They continued to prepare material for the next album tentatively titled "On The Shoulders of Giants" but abandoned this title early 2000 after hearing that the UK band, "Oasis" had chosen it for the title of their upcoming fourth studio album "Standing on the Shoulder of Giants".

Band members met up in Singapore early 1998 and started rehearsing material as well as giving ad hoc interviews to magazines such as "ETC Magazine" who hailed them as Singapore's "first" International Band.

Late September 1998 they were invited to perform live on Channel [V] to an estimated audience of 63 Million viewers which thereafter heightened interest in their music and they performed ad hoc in London, Canterbury and Bradford in 1999 and 2000 with Dan Jupp playing bass for "Livestock" in Bradford (2000) and Dan Compton for three shows at "Gossips" in Soho (London) as Aaron Sequerah promoted the band to prospective producers in Australasia.

During 1998 / early 1999, "Joker", the first single lifted from their debut album had been played on "Triple J" in Australia, the college radio network throughout the United States, the University Network radio throughout the United Kingdom and featured on several BBC radio shows in Ireland including "Across The Line" on "BBC Radio Ulster", presented by Mike Edgar.

The Ground Beneath Her Feet – Mnemonic Version

Mnemonic band members Richard Das and Jonathan Skipp had heard "Bono" and "The Edge" perform a verse of this song as they were writing it for the upcoming film "The Million Dollar Hotel" on a television program in September 1999 and then interpolated subsequent verses and chorus from the "Salman Rushdie" book "The Ground Beneath Her Feet" to complete their own version of the song. Band members contributed their parts and a final version was mixed and completed in December 1999.

The band released it free on the internet downloadable from www.mnemonicgroove.com January 2000 before the official U2 version (released 8, February 2000). Hits on the Mnemonic band website at one point peaked at 97,000+ for one day for the download.

The band were subsequently invited to perform an acoustic version of the song on UK Radio 1.

The news of their version of the song spread to global news agencies and this was widely reported on various media and a feature on the band was done by "The Straits Times".

The release of their version of the song as free downloadable media prompted a "surprisingly favourable" response from "The Edge"

2001–2003: United Kingdom Tours

The band toured the UK extensively and played regularly at Sound in Leicester Square (London) and the Rockgarden (Covent Garden).
Other semi-regular venues included, Dingwalls (Camden Town), Gossips (Soho), Westone Four (West Kensington) and Cambridge University.

The band also competed and won the "Battle of the Bands" competition held at "Redbacks" in West London in 2002.

During this time Kiron Chahel left the band and was replaced by Vince Edwards (2001–2002) then finally with Tim Crane who became the permanent drummer for the band. Arno Robinet stood in for Aaron Sequerah for three shows during this time also (2001–2002).

During 2001, Aaron Sequerah also assumed management and promotional responsibilities for the band supported by Richard Das in addition to their songwriting duties.

The band stopped their heavy touring schedule at the end on 2003 and to work on personal projects.

2004–Current: Album "In-Progress"

Many songs that have been performed live and left over from the initial recording sessions were due to be released as an album but only "Catch" has been officially released (2006) and is available on iTunes.

The band have come together a few times since 2003 to perform live in Soho (London) and private functions.

The band is now unsigned. Richard Das (vocals, guitar, electronics) and Aaron Sequerah (bass) are currently the core members and continue to collaborate on projects.

Drummer Steven Ramondt joined the band in 2012 and the band, as a three piece, are currently rehearsing for live London shows and developing new material to release.

Channel [V] Asia "On Demand"

The band were invited to perform on Channel [V] in September 1998 and were special guests on the one-hour weekly "On Demand" music program hosted by Trey Farley.

They performed "Lost Companion" from their debut album "Non-Verbal Signs of Listening" and "Smash" from their tentatively titled follow up album "On The Shoulders of Giants". The finalised lyrics for "Smash" were completed a few hours before the performance going live on air.

Their performances that evening was viewed by over 63 Million people across 64 countries in Asia and Europe and various subscription satellite networks globally.

Early "Pioneers" of Online Music and Video Collaboration and Distribution – "Dot Com Band"

As a result of their international commitments in 1997, Mnemonic commenced collaborating online to write and mix music remotely using separate instrument and vocal tracks recorded in different countries aided by digital time stamping. Hampered by the lack of broadband and excessive download times the band were still able to collaborate and create demo mixes of songs which they be known for such as "Hero" and "Hard To Love" using tools such as "Sonic Foundry" "Sound Forge".

Known to some in the industry at the time as "The Dot Com Band", Mnemonic were one of the first to use their online presence as a tool to market video and audio content years before "iTunes" and "PayPal" were readily available to the general public.

Their vision was to allow independent bands who were unsigned or did not want the bureaucracy of the major record labels interfering with their success or the integrity of their music to self-promote and market using the internet which at that time had seen significant growth. Furthermore, they believed that music could be made cheaply and with home software and hardware to enable anyone to get their ideas, music and media out to the public outside of the mainstream sources.

The website www.mnemonicgroove.com went through a number of incarnations to allow online sales and showcasing of the band's work.

However, the only means available to the band for online payment in the late 90s with a low administration costs was via postal cheques which hampered the concept altogether. Sales were for physical media were sent via post as broadband had not yet implemented in most countries hampering digital downloading. Music playing software for computers was generally not readily available to the public and limited to professional applications.

Furthermore, online legalities for online purchase and payments were not clear and the band did not have the resources to pursue this thoroughly through legal and logistical avenues.

With regards to online music releases, as founding guitarist Jonathan Skipp mentions in an interview after the release of "The Ground Beneath Her Feet" beating U2's CD single release date;

"To those who believe that music is a product that can be packaged and sold in... little plastic wrappers like salted "durians", ...... "Your old road is rapidly agin'. Please get out of the new one/If you can't lend a hand. For the times they are a-changin'." (Quoting Bob Dylan)

Kiron Chahel also mentions regarding the concept of online releases;

"We are free to do remixes and re-releases as often as we like, and as often as fans like," says drummer Kiron Chahel. It is like software—release it when it's ready and issue upgrades later."

As for the future of music and the demise of physical music media such as CDs and Vinyl in preference to online digital downloading, Richard Das had also completed a dissertation on the subject for his final year at the "SAE Institute".

Music videos

Jenny / Go in Style

The band had filmed the music video for "Jenny", their second single released from "Non-Verbal Signs of Listening" in Los Angeles in 1998 directed by "acclaimed" auteur, Eric Wong whom the band were introduced to at the 1997 "Playboy Mansion" Christmas Party. However, the band were not satisfied with the final product and this was never released.

The music video features American actress Jennifer Storey who had previously appeared in the "Queensrÿche" music video "I Am I" and was shot on various locations in Los Angeles including "Rodeo Drive" in "Beverly Hills, California" and the "Hollywood Walk of Fame".

Elements of the shoot were re-cut and "recycled" to accompany their demo single "Go in Style" released in 2003. https://www.youtube.com/watch?v=oTGSx8r1IYE

Music Releases

Non-Verbal Signs of Listening

Their debut album, Non-Verbal Signs of Listening, co-produced by Dindae Sheena and the band, was released on 23 May 1997 in Singapore on Angel J. Records. Two tracks from the album, "Joker" and "I Ain't Your Bodyguard" gained local airplay.

"Joker" was the first track released on 23 May 1997 and has gained airplay in several countries.

"Jenny" was released to radio stations and media only on 23 May 1998 (still under the name of "Mnemonic Groove"). The CD SIngle pictured the red Ford Mustang featured in the "unreleased" music video for the song.

Trivia

The album title was selected from the 1994 Teacher Created Materials – 443 Literature Unit page 24. In their attempt to be more "eco-friendly", the band were at the time writing lyrics on the blank side of used A4 sheets discarded from the United World College. The title was overleaf on one of the lyric sheets to "Lost Companion" (Track 3)

The woman's laugh at the end of "Joker" is an outtake from a female singer of a local Singaporean band who was also recording an album at the time with Dindae Sheena also producing.

Critical Reception

The album was favourably reviewed in local and regional magazines within Australasia. Reviews of Non-Verbal Signs of Listening noted the album's dark, melodic modern rock sound.

"What a surprising find!" 9/10 – "Cleo" (September 1997)

Livestock 1999 (EP)

Showcasing their live performances at the event held in Bradford, United Kingdom. Dan Jupp standing in for Aaron Jude Sequerah on bass.

Up to the Moment (Demo EP)

Originally a Demo EP which had been circulated to various record producers to showcase the band's music. A number of "bootlegs" of this has been known to be circulated by fans containing several unreleased songs including;

"This Is The First Time" (Live at the Rockgarden),
"Hard To Love",
"Joker" (Destruction Version),
"New Millennium Morning"

Most interesting is the inset cover highlighting some possible ideas for releases on www.mnemonicgroove.com including;

"Mnemonic "Unplugged" – which highlights selected performances from the Channel [V] Hong Kong shows. Besides public airings of their one-hour broadcast, this performance has never been formally released online.

"Mnemonic at The Mansion" – A short documentary of the band's evening at the "Playboy Mansion" and meet and greet sessions with various Playboy models including 1997 Playmate of the Year "Victoria Silvstedt". Members of the band are pictured with "Hugh Hefner" and Silvstedt.

"Hootie Nights" – A short documentary following the band's interactions with "Hootie & the Blowfish" during their 1997 Singapore and 1999 "Sydney" Australia performances.

"Jenny" Single Edit Music Video.

Unplugged (EP)

Released independently in 2006, and based on acoustic live performances at several major venues in the London scene, the "Unplugged EP" featured songs from the band's evolved lineup in a pared-down style. One song from the debut album, the sleeper hit "This Is Where I Fall" shows up towards the end of the collection, showcasing the development of the band and featuring an additional verse.

Others unreleased until now include "Gun". "Nadine" and "Rock and Roll Queen".

Available on iTunes.

Catch (Single)
Released in online music stores Jan 2006.

Not available as a single download in the UK.

Members

Current members
Richard Das – guitar, lead vocals
Aaron Sequerah – bass, backing vocals
Steven Ramondt – drums, percussion

Past members
Jonathan Skipp – lead guitar (1996–2001)
Kiron Chahel – drums (1997–2001)
Dan Jupp – bass (1999)
Daniel Compton – bass (2000)
Vince Edwards – drums (2001–2002)
Arno Robinet – bass (2001–2002)
Andy Bett – lead guitar (2001–2003)
Tim Crane – drums (2002–2003)

References

English rock music groups